Italian Uruguayans (Spanish: ítalo-uruguayos; Italian: italo-uruguaiani) are Uruguayan-born citizens who are fully or partially of Italian descent or Italian-born people in Uruguay. It is estimated that more than one third of Uruguayans are of Italian descent.

Along with its neighboring country, Argentina, Italian immigration to Uruguay is one of the largest, if not the largest, ethnic groups towards Uruguay's modern culture and society, along with Spanish Uruguayans, exhibiting significant connections to Italian culture in terms of language, customs and traditions. Outside of Italy, Uruguay has one of the highest percentages of Italians in the world.

Characteristics
The recorded presence of Italians in Uruguay started with the founding of Montevideo. Nevertheless, Italians began arriving in Uruguay in large numbers in the 1870s, mainly due to economic disturbances. The climax of this wave of Italian immigrants would have occurred from the late XIX century up until the world wars. The migratory continued until the 1960s, when the Italian economic miracle would have helped Italy to be in a better position than it was before.

According to a group of historians, a calculation concluded that in the generation of Uruguayans born after the year 1990, nearly 68%, or more than two thirds of the total, had Italian roots.

History
The first Italians arrived in Spanish and Portuguese colonies of South America in the 16th century. In what is now Uruguay, the first Italians were primarily from the Republic of Genoa and worked in the business and commerce related to the transoceanic shipping between "old and new world". It is notable that the first settler in Montevideo was an Italian, Giorgio Borghese (who Hispanicized his name to Jorge Burgues). The Italian population continued to grow into the 19th century andwhen the constitution of Uruguay was adopted in 1830, there were thousands of Italian-Uruguayans, mostly in the capital, Montevideo.

Immigrants from other areas of Italy followed with Lombardi exiles, craftsmen, farmers, the followers of Garibaldi, Southern Italians of various trades and even those active in many other ways, including a minority of adventurers.

From 1875 to 1890, Italians were the largest part of a wave of immigration to Uruguay from Spain and Italy. That continued in the 20th century until the early 1960s but was followed by a sharp reduction, coinciding with economic and political upheavals in both Uruguay and Italy. Then, Italian immigration continued to decline because of greater attraction exerted by Argentina, Brazil and the United States. By the end of the 20th century, the trend finally began to run out.

As of 2003, there were only 33,000 first-generation Italians in the South American country , but many Uruguayans were well aware of their Italian ancestry. 
By 1976, Uruguayans of Italian descent numbered over 1,300,000, almost 45% of the total population, including Italian-Argentine residents in Uruguay. High concentrations are found in Montevideo and the city of Paysandú, where almost 65% of the population is of Italian origin.

Italian community
The first Italian immigrants who arrived in the land were almost all of Genoese, Piedmontese, Neapolitan, Sicilian and Venetian origin.

In the first half of the 19th century, Giuseppe Garibaldi was a participant in Uruguay's wars for independence, and many Italian patriots in Uruguay were attracted to the ideas of the leader.

The political movement which joined many residents of the Rio de la Plata with Italian was called Current Garibaldina. In recognition of Garibaldi are many tributes to his memory such as a "Avenida" (Course) of Montevideo with its name, a monument to his memory in the city of Salto, and el 'Italian Hospital of Buenos Aires.

Between the late the 19th and the early 20th centuries was the third phase of immigration coming from Italy. Those Italians who arrived and in the fourth stage, after the Second World War, gave a great contribution to Uruguayan architecture and gastronomy. There was the foundation of the Italian Hospital of Montevideo in the last decade of the 19th century, which bears the name of King Umberto I of Italy.

Italians who emigrated to Uruguay in the 19th century worked mainly in construction, trade, and agriculture. Some were able to open the road as politicians and businessmen in the 20th century. Francisco Piria, of Genoese ancestors, became one of the leading manufacturers in Uruguay and even created a seaside town that still bears his name, Piriápolis. Various Italo-Uruguayans became presidents of Uruguay (Addiego, Demicheli, Gabriel Terra, Baldomir, Sanguinetti) and writers of international renown (such as Delmira Agustini and Mario Benedetti).

During the Presidencies of Gabriel Terra and Baldomir Ferrari

During the 1930s, the Italian community became very important in Uruguayan society. That coincided with the rise to power of Italian-Uruguayan Gabriel Terra from 1931 to 1938 and his successor Baldomir Ferrari (1938–1943) and his relatives. President Gabriel Terra was able to obtain land and funding support from Mussolini and Hitler to build a dam on the Rio Negro, creating the largest artificial lake in South America. In addition, Terra promoted the beginning of the process of 'industrialization by means of the Italian companies. He openly appreciated Italian fascism and tried to imitate some characteristics and corporate policies.

In Montevideo, for example, was a political Fascio with 1,200 members, and 150 volunteers gave Italian-Uruguayans the Italian conquest of Ethiopia in 1936.

The Italian diplomat Mazzolini said that Mussolini considered Uruguay as the most "Italian" state of the Americas with which to make a possible future political and ethnic-racial alliance. The Italian language gained considerable importance in Montevideo in those years and became compulsory in secondary schools in Uruguay in 1942 under Ferrari.

Further, around 1938 a certain number of Italian Jews came to Uruguay, feeling rejected in their mother country by the anti-Semitic racial laws.

Demographics

An overall estimate of Italian immigrants to Uruguay from its independence until the 1960s is 350,000 but, given the balance of migration, must be halved. Over a third of the Uruguayan population has an Italian surname. The 2011 Uruguayan census revealed 5,541 people who declared Italy as their country of birth.

The flow of Italians to Uruguay can be broken into several waves:
 
From 1830 to 1850 in which at least 20,000 immigrants arrived, almost all from Piedmont and Liguria.
The 1850s during which an equally-high number landed in Montevideo (about 25,000 from Lombardy and Sardinia).
The 1860s and the 1870s, of about 90,000 Italians from across the country.
The late 19th and the early 20th centuries, characterised by mass migration stimulated by propaganda and prepaid journeys but generally poorly trained and illiterate; 110,000 reached Montevideo.
The 20th century, after the First World War (about 15,000).

Italians in Uruguay come from 40% Northern Italy, 17% Central Italy, and 34% Southern Italy. The main Italian regions of origin are Campania, with 5,231 residents (16% of the total); Lombardy (5,029); Piedmont (4,250); Lazio (3,353); and Liguria (3,018).

In 2007, Italian citizens (including those with dual citizenship with Uruguayan) who are resident in Uruguay were 71,115. The entire Italian community is held in high esteem by the Uruguayan population, also by a marked process italianisation in society especially in the local cuisine (like Caruso sauce) and the local dialect (such as Lunfardo, which probably derives from the dialect word "Lumbarda" of immigrants from Lombardy).

In Uruguay, the Italian influence was more isolated since only 27% of the Italo-Uruguay reside outside the metropolitan area of the capital, but there were different Italian communities and founded several cultural entities (as in Rivera, the border with Brazil).

Alfredo Baldomir Ferrari was the president of Uruguay from 1938 to 1943. In 1942, he made Italian a compulsory subject in secondary schools. Paysandú, near the border with Argentina, has the most Italian influence and is currently estimated that over 60% of its population of about 80,000 inhabitants are of Italian origin. Furthermore, Italian is widely spoken, partly since Italian is taught in all schools. Among the most famous Italian-Uruguayan ties are the EU benevolence, the Scuola Italiana, and the Italian Federation of Paysandú.

The Group of Paysandú Lombardi keeps cultural ties with the Italian emigration, especially with Lombardy.

Cuisine 

The noquis del 29 ("gnocchi of 29") defines the widespread custom in some South American countries of eating a plate of gnocchi, a type of Italian pasta, on the 29th of each month. The custom is widespread especially in the states of the Southern Cone such as Brazil, Argentina, Paraguay, Uruguay; these countries being recipients of a considerable Italian immigration between the end of the 19th century and the beginning of the 20th century. There is a ritual that accompanies lunch with gnocchi, namely putting money under the plate which symbolizes the desire for new gifts. It is also customary to leave a banknote or coin under the plate to attract luck and prosperity to the dinner.

The tradition of serving gnocchi on the 29th of each month stems from a legend based on the story of Saint Pantaleon, a young doctor from Nicomedia who, after converting to Christianity, made a pilgrimage through northern Italy. There Pantaleon practiced miraculous cures for which he was canonized. According to legend, on one occasion when he asked Venetian peasants for bread, they invited him to share their poor table. In gratitude, Pantaleon announced a year of excellent fishing and excellent harvests. That episode occurred on 29 July, and for this reason that day is remembered with a simple meal represented by gnocchi.

Societies
Italian associations in Uruguay are relatively numerous. These are the main ones:

-  Scuola Italiana di Montevideo

-  Circle Lucano

-  Association of Sons of Tuscany

-  Association Veneti in Uruguay

-  Group of Paysandú Lombardi

-  Group Trentini Rivera

-  Association of Lombards in Montevideo (Associazione Lombarda di Montevideo)

Italian in education
Italian-Uruguayan President Alfredo Baldomir Ferrari in 1942 required the study of Italian in state secondary schools. That has made Uruguay the only state in the Americas in which Italian has had an official status in education equal to that of the national language.

In Montevideo, a private school (Scuola Italiana di Montevideo) is attended by the upper-class of the Italian community in the capital. There are also plans to open an Italian university.

Notable people
The following list has well-known Uruguayans who are Italian citizens or have Italian ancestry:

Architecture and engineering
Luigi Andreoni
Leopoldo Artucio
Francisco Beltrame
Jorge Brovetto
Horacio Carabelli
Mauricio Cravotto
Román Fresnedo Siri
Juan Giuria
Giulia Guarino
César Loustau Infantozzi
Aurelio Lucchini
José Luis Massera
Mario Palanti
Bernardo Poncini
Juan Antonio Scasso
Héctor Vigliecca 
Carlo Zucchi

Art
Orestes Acquarone, cartoonist and lithographer
José Belloni, sculptor
Alberto Breccia, cartoonist
Juan José Calandria, painter and sculptor
José Cuneo Perinetti, painter
Pedro Figari, painter
Antonio Frasconi, xylographist 
Giuseppe Maraschini, painter
Virginia Patrone, painter
José Cuneo Perinetti, painter
Amalia Polleri, art critic
Edmundo Prati, sculptor
Luis Queirolo Repetto, painter
Luis Alberto Solari, painter and engraver
Eduardo Vernazza, painter
Petrona Viera Garino, painter
Cecilia Vignolo, sculptor and visual artist

Cinema
Luca Barbareschi, actor
Jorge Bolani, actor
Rubén W. Cavallotti, film director
Florencia Colucci, film actress
Eduardo D'Angelo, film actor and comedian
Mónica Farro, model and actress
Juan Pablo Rebella, film director
Jorge Temponi, actor
Rina Massardi actress and film director
María Noel Riccetto ballet dancer (black swan)
Diego Delgrossi actor
Guillermo Casanova film director

Economy
Francisco Piria de Grossi, businessman

Literature
Delmira Agustini
Mario Benedetti
Helena Corbellini
Luce Fabbri
Liber Falco
Emilio Frugoni
Eduardo Galeano
Marosa di Giorgio
Antonio Lussich
Cristina Peri Rossi
Rodolfo Tálice
Giselda Zani

Music and Opera
Francisco Canaro, violinist
Mario Canaro, tango musician
Abel Carlevaro, classic guitar composer
Maika Ceres, soprano singer
Eduardo Fabini, composer
Sergio Fachelli, singer
Francisco Fattoruso, bass player
Hugo Fattoruso, multi-instrumentalist and vocalist 
Osvaldo Fattoruso, musician
Pablo Minoli, composer
Julio Sosa (Julio María Sosa Venturini), tango singer
Luciana Mocchi, singer
Los TNT, rock'n'roll band consisting of three Italian siblings
Álvaro Pierri, classical guitarist
Guido Santórsola, composer
Daniel Viglietti, folk singer
Roberto Musso Focaccio, rock singer(Cuarteto de nos)
Ricardo Musso Focaccio, musician
Santiago Tavella Nazzari, musician(Cuarteto de nos)
Diego Martino, musician
Frankie Lampariello, bass player
Freddy Bessio, singer
Eduardo Pedro Lombardo, musician
Julio Cobelli, guitarist
José María Carbajal Pruzzo, musician
Alberto Mastrascusa Ilario, guitarist
Ana Prada, musician
Donatto Racciatti, musician
Juan Campodónico, musician
Fernando Santullo, musician
Alberto Magnone, musician
Estela Magnone, musician
Olga Del Grossi, tango singer
Rina Massardi, singer
Rosita Melo, tango musician
Pedro Dalton (Alejandro Fernández Borsani, Buenos muchachos), musician
Juan Casanova, musician
Gustavo Montemurro, musician
Gabriel Peluffo, singer
Gustavo Parodi, guitarist
Guillermo Peluffo, singer
Nicolás Bagattini, musician
Ruben Melogno, singer
Gonzalo Farrugia, drummer
Luis Cesio, guitarist

Politics

Rafael Addiego Bruno, jurist
Danilo Astori, former vice president
Alfredo Baldomir Ferrari, soldier
Jorge Basso,  Minister of Public Health of the Board Front party
Azucena Berrutti, National Defense Minister from 2005 to 2008
Graciela Bianchi, lawyer
Eduardo Bonomi, politician
Luis Brezzo, politician
Diego Cánepa, lawyer and politician
Roberto Canessa, medical student and one of the survivors of Uruguayan Air Force Flight 571
Lorenzo Carnelli, lawyer and politician
Mario Cassinoni, medic, deputy, rector of the national university
César Charlone Rodríguez, former vice president
Juan Vicente Chiarino,  lawyer and politician
Alberto Demicheli, former president
Emilio Frugoni, socialist politician
Reinaldo Gargano, former foreign minister of Uruguay
Luis Giannattasio Finocchietti, political figure
Isabelino Canaveris, patriot of the National Party
Telmo Languiller-Tornesi, Australian politician born in Uruguay
Paulina Luisi, leader of the Uruguayan feminist movement
Antonio Marchesano, lawyer and politician
Aparicio Méndez Manfredini, political figure
Rafael Michelini, politician
Zelmar Michelini, father of Rafael Michelini, and reporter
José Mujica Cordano, former president
Benito Nardone, journalist
Didier Opertti, lawyer 
Sergio Previtali, politician
Víctor Rossi, politician
Julio María Sanguinetti, former president 
Jorge Sapelli, former vice president
Raúl Sendic Antonaccio, Marxist lawyer and founder of the Tupamaros National Liberation Movement
Líber Seregni, military officer and politician
Héctor Martín Sturla, lawyer
Enrique Tarigo, jurist

Religious figures
Juan Francisco Aragone, cleric
Antonio María Barbieri, cardinal
Carlos María Collazzi, bishop of Mercedes
Pablo Galimberti, cleric
José Gottardi Cristelli, cleric
Carlos Parteli, cleric
Anna Maria Rubatto, nun
Daniel Sturla, archbishop of Montevideo
Milton Luis Tróccoli Cebedio, cleric

Science and Medicine
Carlos Aragone, physicist
Alice Armand Ugón, pediatrician
Rodolfo Gambini, physicist and professor of the Universidad de la Republica
Juan Giambruno, cardiac surgeon
Esmeralda Mallada Invernizzi, astronomer
José Luis Massera, mathematician
Enrique Loedel Palumbo, physicist

Sports

Nelson Abeijón Pessi, footballer
Edgardo Adinolfi, footballer
Peregrino Anselmo, footballer
Claudio Arbiza Zanuttini, footballer
Felipe Avenatti, footballer
Daniel Baldi, footballer and writer
Raúl Banfi, footballer
Deivis Barone, footballer
Daniel Bartolotta, footballer
Fausto Batignani, footballer
Víctor Manuel Battaini, footballer
José Benincasa, footballer
Víctor Hugo Berardi, basketball coach
Felipe Berchesi, rugby player
Mario Ludovico Bergara, footballer
Francisco Bertocchi, footballer
Adrián Bertolini, basketball player
Nicolás Biglianti, footballer
Joe Bizera, footballer
Mariano Bogliacino, footballer
Fiorella Bonicelli, tennis player
Juan Boselli, footballer
Juan Manuel Boselli, footballer
Miguel Bossio, footballer 
Juan Bregaliano, boxer
Nicolas Brignoni, rugby union player
Marcelo Broli, footballer
Francisco Bulanti, rugby union player
Fabrizio Buschiazzo, footballer
Wilmar Cabrera Sappa, footballer
Washington Cacciavillani, footballer
Mathías Calfani, basketball player
Antonio Campolo, footballer
Adhemar Canavesi, footballer
Agustín Canobbio, footballer
Carlos Canobbio, footballer
Fabián Canobbio, footballer 
Osvaldo Canobbio, footballer
Eitel Cantoni, racing driver 
Mariano Cappi, footballer
Miguel Capuccini, footballer
Alberto Cardaccio, footballer
Mathías Cardaccio, footballer
Fabián Carini, footballer 
Fernando Carreño Colombo, footballer
Jorge Daniel Casanova, footballer
Martín Cauteruccio, footballer
Edinson Cavani, footballer
Gastón Cellerino Grasso, footballer
Pablo Cepellini, footballer
Aníbal Ciocca, footballer
Ignacio Conti, rugby union player
Juan Carlos Corazzo, footballer
Walter Corbo, footballer 
Erardo Cóccaro, footballer
Sergio Cortelezzi, footballer
Francisco Costanzo, boxer 
Claudio Dadómo Minervini, footballer 
José Luis Damiani, tennis player
Luis de Agustini, footballer
Giorgian De Arrascaeta Benedetti, footballer
Fabián Estoyanoff Poggio, footballer
Ricardo Faccio, footballer 
Mónica Falcioni, jumper
César Falletti, footballer 
Maximiliano Faotto, footballer
Damián Frascarelli, footballer
Daniel Fascioli, footballer 
Francisco Fedullo, footballer
Sebastián Fernández Miglierina, footballer 
Fabricio Ferrari, cyclist
Juan Ferreri, footballer
Mateo Fígoli, footballer 
Alfredo Foglino, footballer
Marcelo Filippini, tennis player 
Sebastián Flores Stefanovich, footballer
Daniel Fonseca, footballer
Alejandro Foglia, sailor
Diego Forlán Corazzo, footballer
Bruno Fornaroli, footballer
Jorge Fossati, footballer
Enzo Francescoli, footballer 
Damián Frascarelli, footballer
Víctor Frattini, footballer
Francisco Frione, footballer
Ricardo Alberto Frione, footballer
Jorge Fucile, footballer 
Pablo Gaglianone, footballer
Jhony Galli, footballer 
Schubert Gambetta, footballer
Juan Manuel Gaminara, rugby union player
Walter Gargano, footballer
Leandro Gelpi, footballer
Eduardo Gerolami, footballer 
Alcides Ghiggia, footballer 
Guillermo Giacomazzi, footballer 
Jorge Giordano, footballer
Wilson Graniolatti, footballer 
Walter Guglielmone, footballer
Gianni Guigou, footballer
Nelson Gutiérrez Luongo, footballer 
Pablo Fernando Hernández Roetti, footballer
Juan Legnazzi, footballer
Alejandro Lembo, footballer
Roberto Leopardi, footballer
Mario Lorenzo, footballer
Maximiliano Lombardi, footballer 
Adesio Lombardo, basketball player 
Diego Lugano, footballer 
Damián Macaluso, footballer
Carlos Macchi, footballer
Héctor Macchiavello, footballer
Stefanía Maggiolini, footballer
Ildo Maneiro Ghezzi, footballer
Walter Mantegazza, footballer
Williams Martínez Fracchia, footballer
Ernesto Mascheroni, footballer
Juan Cruz Mascia, footballer 
Roque Máspoli, footballer
Roberto Matosas Postiglione, footballer
Gonzalo Mastriani, footballer
Andrés Mazali, footballer
Nicolás Mazzarino, basketball player
Leonardo Melazzi, footballer 
Ángel Melogno, footballer
Bruno Méndez Cittadini, footballer
Ana Lucía Migliarini de León, tennis player
Leonardo Migliónico, footballer 
Facundo Milán, footballer 
Franco Milano, footballer
Oscar Moglia, basketball player
Paolo Montero, footballer
José Nasazzi, footballer 
Ignacio Nicolini, footballer
Martín Osimani, basketball player 
Jorge Ottati (Junior), sports announcer
Jorge Ottati (Senior), sports announcer
Antonio Pacheco D'Agosti, footballer 
Walter Pandiani, footballer
Luciano Parodi, basketball player
Joaquin Pastore, rugby union player
Rodrigo Pastorini, footballer
Alberico Passadore, rugby union player 
Ricardo Pavoni, footballer
Luis Alberto Pedemonte, footballer 
Waldemar Pedrazzi, cyclist
Pedro Pedrucci, footballer 
Walter Pelletti, footballer
Diego Perrone, footballer
Alfredo Petrone, boxer 
Pedro Petrone, footballer 
Paulo Pezzolano, footballer
Miguel Ángel Piazza, footballer 
Luis Pierri, basketball players
Víctor Pignanelli, footballer
Rodolfo Pini, footballer
Nitder Pizzani, footballer
Gonzalo Pizzichillo, footballer
Inti Podestá Mezzetta, footballer
Diego Polenta Musetti, footballer 
Richard Porta Candelaresi, footballer 
Roberto Porta, footballer
Gastón Puerari, footballer 
Ettore Puricelli, footballer
Carlos Riolfo, footballer 
Federico Ricca, footballer 
Eduardo Risso, rower
Pedro Rocha Franchetti, footballer
Cristian Rodríguez Barotti, footballer 
Leandro Rodríguez Telechea, footballer 
Luis Romero, footballer 
Bernardo Roselli, chess master
Diego Rossi, footballer 
Marcelo Rotti, footballer
José Luis Russo, footballer
Jonathan Sabbatini, footballer
Antonio Sacco, footballer
Mario Sagario, rugby union player
Guillermo Sanguinetti, footballer 
Mateo Sanguinetti, rugby union player 
Raffaele Sansone, footballer
Federico Sansonetti, tennis player 
Sergio Santín, footballer
Cayetano Saporiti, footballer 
Marcelo Saracchi, footballer 
Carlos Scanavino, freestyle swimmer
Héctor Scarone, footballer
Juan Alberto Schiaffino, footballer 
Raúl Schiaffino, footballer
Andrés Scotti, footballer 
Diego Scotti, footballer
Robert Siboldi, footballer 
Marcelo Signorelli, basketball coach
Gastón Silva Perdomo, footballer
Martín Silva, footballer
Gustavo de Simone, footballer 
Cristhian Stuani, footballer 
Alberto Suppici, football coach
José Luis Tancredi, footballer 
Pablo Tiscornia, football coach
Humberto Tomasina, footballer
Lucas Torreira Di Pascua, footballer 
Marco Vanzini, footballer 
Ernesto Servolo Vidal, footballer 
Nicolás Vigneri, footballer 
Pedro Vigorito, footballer
Tomaso Luis Volpi, footballer 
Javier Zeoli, footballer 
Jorge Zerbino, rugby union player
Alfredo Zibechi, footballer
Pedro Zingone, footballer

See also

Uruguayans in Italy
Demographics of Uruguay
Immigration to Uruguay
Lunfardo
Italy–Uruguay relations
Italian Argentine

References

Sources
 Goebel, Michael. "Gauchos, Gringos and Gallegos: The Assimilation of Italian and Spanish Immigrants in the Making of Modern Uruguay 1880–1930," Past and Present (2010) 208(1): 191–229.
 Bresciano, Juan Andrés. "L'Immigrazione Italiana in Uruguay Nella Piu Recente Storiografia (1990-2005)." ["Italian immigration to Uruguay in the most recent historiography, 1990-2005"] Studi Emigrazione, June 2008, Vol. 45 Issue 170, pp 287–299

External links
 

 
European Uruguayan
Uruguay
 
Italian immigration to Uruguay
Immigration to Uruguay
Ethnic groups in Uruguay